Clay Glennford Sweeting (born 21 December 1985) is a Bahamian politician from the Progressive Liberal Party currently serving as MP Central and South Eleuthera.

Political career 
On 20 September 2021 he was appointed Minister of Agriculture and Marine Resources.

References

See also 

 14th Bahamian Parliament

Living people
1985 births
People from Eleuthera
21st-century Bahamian politicians
Progressive Liberal Party politicians
Members of the House of Assembly of the Bahamas
Government ministers of the Bahamas